Edward Thwaites (4 October 1801 at Staplehurst, Kent  18 January 1872 in Hastings, Sussex) was an English professional cricketer who played first-class cricket from 1825 to 1837.  He was mainly associated with Kent and Sussex.  He made 25 known appearances in first-class matches including 1 for the Players in 1827.

References

1801 births
1872 deaths
English cricketers
English cricketers of 1787 to 1825
English cricketers of 1826 to 1863
Players cricketers
Kent cricketers
Sussex cricketers
People from Staplehurst